Jörgen Kruse (born 14 August 1967) is a Swedish bobsledder. He competed in the four man event at the 1994 Winter Olympics.

References

1967 births
Living people
Swedish male bobsledders
Olympic bobsledders of Sweden
Bobsledders at the 1994 Winter Olympics
Sportspeople from Stockholm
20th-century Swedish people